José "Cheo" Ramos was a professional baseball outfielder who played in the Negro leagues and the Cuban League in the 1910s and 1920s.

Ramos made his professional debut in 1918 with Habana of the Cuban League. In 1921, he played Negro league baseball with the All Cubans, but spent the majority of the 1920s in the Cuban League with Habana and Almendares. Ramos returned to the Negro leagues in 1929, finishing his playing career with the Cuban Stars (East). He remained in the game as a manager through the 1950s, skippering the Nicaragua national baseball team in 1954.

References

External links
 and Baseball-Reference Black Baseball stats and Seamheads

Place of birth missing
Place of death missing
Year of birth missing
Year of death missing
All Cubans players
Almendares (baseball) players
Cuban Stars (East) players
Habana players